A U.S. federal law, the Swamp Land Act of 1850, fully titled "An act to enable the State of Arkansas and other States to reclaim the swamp lands within their limits", essentially provided a mechanism for reverting title of federally-owned swampland to states which would agree to drain the land and turn it to productive, agricultural use. Later considered to have been ecologically problematic, many of its provisions were in time reversed by the Clean Water Act of 1972 and later legislation, but its historical effects on U.S. development and settlement patterns remained.

In Louisiana, this law gave the state eight and a half million acres of river swamps and marshes to sell to pay for flood control measures. Under this plan, thousands of acres of virgin cypress in the Atchafalaya Basin were sold to large corporations, often for seventy-five cents per acre or less. In return, the state began the construction of a few low levees and performed periodic dredging. But an increase in flooding in the Basin, due to raft removal on the upper Atchafalaya River, gave Timber companies more water to float their products to market, allowing the complete destruction of the old growth cypress forests to ensue with little pushback.

External links
 Act full text

References

1850s in the environment
1850 in American law
Everglades
United States federal environmental legislation
United States federal legislation articles without infoboxes